The Raleigh Chopper is a children's / young adults bicycle, a wheelie bike, manufactured and marketed from the 1960s to 2005 by the Raleigh Bicycle Company of Nottingham, England. Its unique design became a cultural icon and is fondly remembered by many who grew up in that period. The design was influenced by dragsters, "chopped" motorcycles, beach buggys, and even chariots, as can be seen on the centre page of the 1969 Raleigh US catalogue.The bicycle has featured in many movies and TV series including the Goonies, MK1 models produced from 1967 to 1973 , MK2 models produced from 1973 to 1985 and MK3 models produced from 1996 to 2005
MK1 - available only as a 3 speed model, Brilliant Orange, Golden Yellow, Flamboyant Green, Targa Mustard (HBR model), and Horizon Blue.
 Sprint GT - available in either Bronze or Flamboyant Green.
 MK2 - standard 3 speed models available in Infra Red, Ultra Violet, Fizzy Lemon, Quick Silver, Space Blue, and Jet Black (Prismatic decal model).
 MK2 - Pink 5 Speed (Derailleur), Mk2 Lime Green 5 Speed(Derailleur).
 MK2 - SE with cast alloy mags to commemorate 750,000 choppers
 MK3 - Standard available in Black, Purple, Red, Silver, Pink, Yellow
 MK3 - Special & Limited editions, The Hot One limited edition in Red 1000 made, The Black limited edition in Black 1000 made, World Cup 2002 edition in White 1000 made, Beano edition in Multi colour 500 made, Armed forces edition in White 500 made, Ben Sherman edition in White 500 made.

Mk1 1967 to 1973 The Chopper's patent was applied for in the US in 1967.  The Chopper was introduced at American trade shows in January 1969 but it was not until April 1969 when Raleigh Choppers were available for public to purchase. The bike featured a choice of a single-speed coaster hub, or a 3-speed or 5-speed Sturmey Archer gear hub, selected using a frame-mounted console gear lever. Other features that appealed to the youth market were the unusual frame, long padded high-back seat, sprung seat at the back, high-rise (ape hanger) handlebars, 'bobbed' mudguards (fenders) and differently sized wheels:  front and  rear. The rear hoop above the seat resembled a dragster anti roll bar "sissy bar". Even the kickstand was designed to give the stationary bicycle a lean reminiscent of a parked motorcycle. Tyres were wider than usual for the time, with a chunky tread on the rear wheel, featuring a red line around the sidewall.

In 1969 the Raleigh Chopper was launched in the UK market this was a triple launch for Raleigh and Mk1 ran until 1973 with the Chopper branded as THE HoT oNE, alongside the Moulton Mk3 (The Smooth One), and the RSW Mk3 (The Dolly One). The Chopper bike was sold as a "must have" item and signifier of "coolness" for many children at the time.

Mk 2 
Mk2 1973 to 1985 The Mk 2 ("Mark 2") Chopper was an improved version sold from 1973. It had the rarely-purchased option of five-speed derailleur gears, and the gear lever shifter changed from a knob to a T-bar-style shifter. (The early 1969 'Tall frame' model already sported the T-bar style, albeit in black with the elliptical window within the shifter cover.) The frame was subtly revised, and the seat moved forward, to help prevent the front of the bicycle tipping up. A small rear rack was added. The handlebars were welded to the stem to stop children from inclining the "ape hanger" bars backward, thereby rendering the bicycle almost unsteerable. A drop-handlebar version, the Sprint, was also produced, this differed from the standard Mk 2, as it had a slightly taller frame. The Chopper Mk 2 remained in production until 1985, by which time the BMX craze had taken over its market. However, the Chopper almost single-handedly rescued Raleigh, which had been in decline during the 1960s, selling millions worldwide

MK 3

Mk3 1996 to 2005 Improved handling and safety upgrades sold from 1996 , changes to the gear lever from central position to handles and the seating changed from a single bar to a double seat ,, the gear changes on the MK3 were much smoother than previous marks although many didnt like the change of gear position, the MK3 came in various colours including Purple, Yellow, Silver, White, Black, Red and did very limited runs of Limited Editions such as The Hot one, The Black,World Cup Edition, Armed Forces edition, Beano edition, and Ben Sherman edition which now are very sought after due to very small numbers produced. 

The Mk3 production were no longer made in Nottingham UK and instead production moved to both USA and Vietnam made under licence.

Revival: Marks 3, 4 & 5
After being out of production for almost 11 years, a new version of the Chopper, the Mk3, was launched in February 1996. It was available at first in red, then purple then various colours followed including Limited Edition models, in deference to modern safety concerns, adopted a more conventional saddle design to discourage "backies", and dropped the groin-catching gear lever in favour of handlebar mounted gear controls; to commemorate this former feature the Mk3 had a sticker where the lever once was located. Rather than steel, the frame was made from aluminium alloy tubing to make the bicycle lighter. The wheels were still 20 inches at the back and 16 at the front. The Mk3 remained in production until 2004 when it was replaced by the slightly changed Mk4 Mk5, which were only produced and sold in China and never released in Europe or North America and ceased production in summer 2018 and were only sold in Asia, included many editions such as the Ninja, the JPS and the Mod. A 6-speed Shimano derailleur replaced the 3-speed Sturmey Archer hub.

Design
The Raleigh Chopper's design has been subject of debate but only since 1996, with claims by Alan Oakley (1927-2012) chief designer for Raleigh and then more than 30 yrs later, from Tom Karen of OGLE Design. 

Alan Oakley's archive was sold in 2018 (Mellor & Kirk Auctioneers, Nottingham, August 2018) and reveals valuable insight into this debate that until 2018 had not been seen in public. The archive reveals that the Design Council did not consult Raleigh before citing Tom Karen as designer of the Chopper and the Design Museum merely acknowledge Karen as the designer of the finished 'product'. The Oakley archive contains an account from the then Managing Director and Chairman of Raleigh that reveals the reasoning for Raleigh sending their chief designer to America for a three week fact-finding mission, it describes the trip, the 'envelope sketch' that provided the inspiration for the eventual product and the months following the trip. It describes the market's need for the Chopper and the strategy for going to market. Whilst this debate was active for a short while, study of the Oakley archive confirms that Oakley's famous envelope sketch was the inspriation and was included in the brief that was offered to an outside design firm, OGLE design, who then designed the product. 

The Raleigh Chopper was the bike that rescued Raleigh from administration with huge global sales from a total production run including Mk1 Mk2 Mk3 models which ran from 1967 to 2005, The Chopper featured in numerous TV series and movies throughout the 1970s and 1980s, including "The Goonies" "Back to the future" , Until the BMX came along in the mid-1980s, the Chopper outsold other bikes by 6 to 1. 

In 2014 a MK2 Raleigh Chopper 1980 gifted to US President Ronald Reagan sold at auction for a record $35,000. 

The Chopper was designed in response to the Schwinn Sting-Ray, and an earlier attempt, called the Rodeo, which was not commercially successful. The popularity of the Chopper also led to a range of smaller bikes following a similar design theme. These included the Raleigh Chipper, Tomahawk and Budgie models, aimed at younger riders.

History

Mk 1 

Mk1 1967 to 1973 The Chopper's patent was applied for in the US in 1967.  The Chopper was introduced at American trade shows in January 1969 but it was not until April 1969 when Raleigh Choppers were available for public to purchase. The bike featured a choice of a single-speed coaster hub, or a 3-speed or 5-speed Sturmey Archer gear hub, selected using a frame-mounted console gear lever. Other features that appealed to the youth market were the unusual frame, long padded high-back seat, sprung seat at the back, high-rise (ape hanger) handlebars, 'bobbed' mudguards (fenders) and differently sized wheels:  front and  rear. The rear hoop above the seat resembled a dragster anti roll bar "sissy bar". Even the kickstand was designed to give the stationary bicycle a lean reminiscent of a parked motorcycle. Tyres were wider than usual for the time, with a chunky tread on the rear wheel, featuring a red line around the sidewall. 

In 1969 the Raleigh Chopper was launched in the UK market this was a triple launch for Raleigh and Mk1 ran until 1973 with the Chopper branded as THE HoT oNE, alongside the Moulton Mk3 (The Smooth One), and the RSW Mk3 (The Dolly One). The Chopper bike was sold as a "must have" item and signifier of "coolness" for many children at the time.

Mk 2 
Mk2 1973 to 1985 The Mk 2 ("Mark 2") Chopper was an improved version sold from 1973. It had the rarely-purchased option of five-speed derailleur gears, and the gear lever shifter changed from a knob to a T-bar-style shifter. (The early 1969 'Tall frame' model already sported the T-bar style, albeit in black with the elliptical window within the shifter cover.) The frame was subtly revised, and the seat moved forward, to help prevent the front of the bicycle tipping up. A small rear rack was added. The handlebars were welded to the stem to stop children from inclining the "ape hanger" bars backward, thereby rendering the bicycle almost unsteerable. A drop-handlebar version, the Sprint, was also produced, this differed from the standard Mk 2, as it had a slightly taller frame. The Chopper Mk 2 remained in production until 1985, by which time the BMX craze had taken over its market. However, the Chopper almost single-handedly rescued Raleigh, which had been in decline during the 1960s, selling millions worldwide.

MK 3

Mk3 1996 to 2005 Improved handling and safety upgrades sold from 1996 , changes to the gear lever from central position to handles and the seating changed from a single bar to a double seat ,, the gear changes on the MK3 were much smoother than previous marks although many didnt like the change of gear position, the MK3 came in various colours including Purple, Yellow, Silver, White, Black, Red and did very limited runs of Limited Editions such as The Hot one, The Black,World Cup Edition, Armed Forces edition, Beano edition, and Ben Sherman edition which now are very sought after due to very small numbers produced. 

The Mk3 production were no longer made in Nottingham UK and instead production moved to both USA and Vietnam made under licence.

Handling and safety 
The original Chopper is fondly remembered, though it was not without problems: It was less stable than a conventional bicycle and trickier to ride. The Chopper was not suitable for cycling long distances as it was slow and heavy, the wide tyres creating significant rolling resistance. At moderate speeds it suffered speed wobbles. After several reported accidents, it was attacked in the press as a dangerous toy. The long seat lent itself to giving lifts to others, and accidents were not uncommon. It could perform involuntary wheelies readily, again a frequent cause of accidents. The position of the gear lever could also contribute to injuries sustained in a crash - especially on the Mk I because the gear knob could easily be removed and lost, turning the gear lever into a metal spike.

Original models

UK market
 MK1 - available only as a 3 speed model, Brilliant Orange, Golden Yellow, Flamboyant Green, Targa Mustard (HBR model), and Horizon Blue.
 Sprint GT - available in either Bronze or Flamboyant Green.
 MK2 - standard 3 speed models available in Infra Red, Ultra Violet, Fizzy Lemon, Quick Silver, Space Blue, and Jet Black (Prismatic decal model).
 MK2 - Pink 5 Speed (Derailleur), Mk2 Lime Green 5 Speed(Derailleur). 
 MK2 - SE with cast alloy mags to commemorate 750,000 choppers
 MK3 - Standard available in Black, Purple, Red, Silver, Pink, Yellow
 MK3 - Special & Limited editions, The Hot One limited edition in Red 1000 made, The Black limited edition in Black 1000 made, World Cup 2002 edition in White 1000 made, Beano edition in Multi colour 500 made, Armed forces edition in White 500 made, Ben Sherman edition in White 500 made.

North American market
The North American market had a much wider spectrum of models and colours available. In 1971 there was a ban on tall sissy bars so the chopper was only sold with a low back rest. A summary of US models:

 MK1 1969 'Tall Frames'; available as a single speed coaster (SC), 3 speed (AW - three speed and TCW - three speed coaster), and 5 speed (S5 - 3+2).
 MK1 1970-1972 available as a single speed coaster (SC), 3 speed (AW - three speed and TCW/S3C - three speed coasters) 5 speed (S5 - 3+2) 5 speed and 10 speed (derallieur). The single and three speed models were also available as a Girl’s model without crossbar.
 MK2 available as a 3 speed (AW) and 5 speed (S5 - 3+2). 1973 -1984
 MK3 3 speed handlebar shift 1996 - 2005

Canada

The Raleigh Chopper was also sold through Eaton's in Canada, badged as Gliders, and sold as the Fastback 100, Fastback XT101, SS357, ULT, Princess and MACH-2 models.

Worldwide sales 
Raleigh sold the Chopper to many countries worldwide. In some countries Raleigh chose to sell Choppers with alternative brands. These included BSA, Hercules, Humber, Malvern Star, Phillips, Robin Hood, Rudge and Speedwell Fireballs.

Imitators 
The success of the Chopper led to similarly styled imitators, such as the Pavemaster Trusty Tracker, Triang Dragster, Dawes Zipper, Panther and Vindec High Riser in the UK as well as the very close copy of an Mk 2 named "Cincoa" and in more recent years the Ground Cruiser which was sold in the UK at the same time as the release of the MK 3.

Revival: Marks 3, 4 & 5
After being out of production for almost 11 years, a new version of the Chopper, the Mk3, was launched in February 1996. It was available at first in red, then purple then various colours followed including Limited Edition models, in deference to modern safety concerns, adopted a more conventional saddle design to discourage "backies", and dropped the groin-catching gear lever in favour of handlebar mounted gear controls; to commemorate this former feature the Mk3 had a sticker where the lever once was located. Rather than steel, the frame was made from aluminium alloy tubing to make the bicycle lighter. The wheels were still 20 inches at the back and 16 at the front. The Mk3 remained in production until 2004 when it was replaced by the slightly changed Mk4 Mk5, which were only produced and sold in China and never released in Europe or North America and ceased production in summer 2018 and were only sold in Asia, included many editions such as the Ninja, the JPS and the Mod. A 6-speed Shimano derailleur replaced the 3-speed Sturmey Archer hub.

See also 
 Chopper bicycle
 Outline of cycling
 Raleigh Bicycle Company
 Schwinn Bicycle Company

References

External links 
 The Chopper Club
 Raleigh Chopper Fan Group

Cycle types
Chopper